The International Review of Administrative Sciences is a quarterly peer-reviewed academic journal covering the field of public administration. The  editor-in-chief is Andrew Massey (University of Exeter). It was established in 1928 and is published by SAGE Publications on behalf of the International Institute of Administrative Sciences. From 1953-1956 it was known as Progress in Public Administration.

Abstracting and indexing 
The journal is abstracted and indexed in:
Current Contents/Social and Behavioral Sciences
GEOBASE
ProQuest databases
Scopus
Social Sciences Citation Index
According to the Journal Citation Reports, the journal has a 2017 impact factor of 1.988.

References

External links 
 

SAGE Publishing academic journals
Multilingual journals
Business and management journals
Quarterly journals
Publications established in 1928